The 2008 congressional elections in Idaho were held on November 4, 2008 to determine who would represent the state of Idaho in the United States House of Representatives, coinciding with the presidential and senatorial elections. Representatives are elected for two-year terms; those elected will serve in the 111th Congress from January 3, 2009 until January 3, 2011.

Idaho has two seats in the House, apportioned according to the 2000 United States Census. Representatives are elected for two-year terms. Its 2007–09 congressional delegation consisted of two Republicans. In the 2008 elections, District 1 was won by Democrat Walt Minnick, so Idaho's delegation to the 111th Congress consists of one Republican and one Democrat. CQ Politics had forecasted District 1 to be at some risk for the incumbent party. , this was the last time a Democrat was elected to congress from Idaho.

The statewide primary elections were held May 27, 2008.

Overview

Match-up summary

District 1

This district includes most of the Boise metropolitan area and northern Idaho, including all of the Idaho Panhandle. Major cities in the district include Nampa, Meridian, Coeur d'Alene, Lewiston as well as precincts in western Boise. Usually a Republican stronghold, in 2006 Bill Sali (campaign website) won an open seat race with only 50 percent of the vote over Larry Grant's 45 percent.

In 2008 Sali faced Walt Minnick (campaign website), a businessman and former White House staffer who had been the unsuccessful Democratic nominee for the U.S. Senate in 1996. Grant announced his intention to run for the seat again, but withdrew from the race before the primary and endorsed Minnick instead. Sali defeated Iraq war veteran Matt Salisbury with 60 percent of the vote in the May 27 Republican primary. Minnick won the Democratic nomination unopposed.

Initially, Sali was considered safe due to the district's heavily Republican nature (CPVI R+19), and the race was initially rated 'Safe Republican' by the non-partisan Cook Political Report. However, it soon became increasingly competitive. According to The Wall Street Journal, a combination of poor fund raising (Sali trailed Minnick by nearly $200,000 according to reports in May) and Sali's combative reputation gave Minnick a chance to upset Sali despite the district's conservative majority. Many moderates who would have normally leaned Republican were reportedly concerned by Sali's far-right social views in a state where conservative voters have historically cared more about small government issues than social issues.

As a result, the Cook Political Report adjusted its rating for the race throughout the campaign, moving it to 'Likely Republican' on July 3, 'Leans Republican' on September 18, and 'Republican Toss Up' on October 23. CQ Politics forecasted the race as 'Republican Favored', but changed its rating to 'No Clear Favorite' late in the campaign. The Rothenberg Report rated it as 'Lean Republican'.
Race ranking and details from CQ Politics
Campaign contributions from OpenSecrets
2008 Idaho CD-01 graph of collected polls at Pollster.com

Results
Minnick defeated Sali by just over 4,000 votes. Minnick was the first Democrat to be elected to Congress from Idaho since Larry LaRocco was defeated for reelection to this seat in 1994; he was only the second Democrat to hold the seat since the 1960s. According to CPVI, as calculated using the 2004 and 2008 presidential election results, Idaho's first district was the third most Republican-leaning district in the country to be represented by a Democrat in the 111th Congress.

District 2

This district includes the Eastern Idaho and Magic Valley regions of Idaho, including the cities of Pocatello, Idaho Falls and Twin Falls, as well as parts of Boise on its western edge. The seat was held by Republican Mike Simpson, who was first elected in 1998.

Simpson (campaign website) ran for reelection against Democratic nominee Deborah Holmes (campaign website), a first-time candidate for public office. Both Simpson and Holmes decisively won their respective primaries. Although parts of the district have trended Democratic in recent years, including Blaine County, Teton County and the Boise precincts located in the district, a strong Mormon voting bloc has kept the district in Republican hands. CQ Politics forecasts the race as 'Safe Republican'.
Race ranking and details from CQ Politics
Campaign contributions from OpenSecrets

Results
Mike Simpson easily won reelection over Deborah Holmes, receiving 71 percent of the vote.

References

External links
Elections, Campaign Disclosure and Lobbyists from the Idaho Secretary of State
U.S. Congress candidates for Idaho at Project Vote Smart
Idaho U.S. House Races from 2008 Race Tracker
Campaign contributions for Idaho congressional races from OpenSecrets

2008
Idaho
United States House of Representatives